Life's Shadows is a 1916 American silent drama film directed by William Nigh and starring Nigh, Irene Howley and Robert Elliott.

Cast
 William Nigh as Martin Bradley
 Irene Howley as Madge Morrow
 Will S. Stevens as Hugh Thorndyke
 Robert Elliott as Rodney Thorndyke
 Roy Clair as Chester Thorndyke
 Kathleen Allaire as Dulcie Thorndyke
 Ruth Thorp as Mary Graves
 Grace Stevens as Melinda Liggett 
 William Yearance as James Durkel 
 Frank Montgomery as Jim Downing
 David Thompson as H. Spencer Seatoon
 Harry Linson as Lem Harding
 Harry Blakemore as Scudder Coleman

References

Bibliography
Parish, James Robert & Pitts, Michael R. Film directors: a guide to their American films. Scarecrow Press, 1974.

External links
 

1916 films
1916 drama films
1910s English-language films
American silent feature films
Silent American drama films
Films directed by William Nigh
Metro Pictures films
1910s American films